Sophia Everest (also Sophia Everest Aurora; born Myat Su Khine on 30 April 1992) is a Burmese singer and actress. She gained recognition from competing in the first season of Myanmar Idol, a televised singing competition.

Early life and education
Sophia Everest was born on 30 April 1992 in Yangon, Myanmar. She is the second daughter of three siblings, having an older sister and younger brother. She is a practicing Buddhist. She attended high school at Practising School Yangon Institute of Education and graduated in Biotechnology from Republic Polytechnic in 2014. Everest was interested in singing since childhood, participating in City FM singing contest, and winning first prize when she was 11 years old.

Music career

2016: Competing in Myanmar Idol and recognition

Everest started her music career as a contestant in the first season of Myanmar Idol, a televised singing competition. In the Myanmar Idol Top 4 finalists contest week, she competed with Saw Lah Htaw Wah, M Zaw Rain and Ninzi May, performing Saung Oo Hlaing's songs and was placed in the top 4. After she competed in Season 1 of Myanmar Idol, she engaged in shooting commercial advertisements, stage performances, and many concerts at various locations throughout Myanmar. She released her hit single "Crush On You" on 1 November 2016.

2017–present: Solo debut and rising popularity
Everest launched her debut solo album "NVM" (Never Mind) on 26 February 2017. The album was listed No. 4 at "The best seller top 10 album of 2017". Her second solo album "Nint Yae" (နင့်ရဲ့), was released on 18 March 2018.

Sophia is the first female artist to have more than one No.1 song on Major M Local Top 30 Chart. Her single "Stay Open", collaboration with Raymond, Diramore, and MØ & Diplo peaked at No.1 in 2018. In 2019, she released her single "Medusa", collaboration with Moe Htet (B+) and peaked at No.1 on Major M Local Top 30 Chart.

Acting career

2017: Film debut
Sophia Everest made her film debut with a leading role in the film Naung Bal Tot Mha Ma Mone (Never Hate Again), alongside actress Hsu Eaint San and actor Thu Riya. The film was directed by Mae Min Bon, and film released in October 2017. She then starred in her second film Nauk Kyaw Ka Dar, where she played the leading role with Thu Riya. The film released in November 2017.

Brand Ambassadorships
Sophia was appointed as brand ambassador of Tuborg on 26 February 2018.

Filmography

Film
 Naung Bal Tot Mha Ma Mone (2017)
 Nauk Kyaw Ka Dar (2017)

Discography

Solo album
 NVM (Never Mind) (2017)
 Nint Yae (2018)

Singles

 Crush On You (2016)
 Poison (2018)
 Medusa (2019)

References

External links
 

1992 births
Living people
21st-century Burmese women singers
Burmese singer-songwriters
Burmese film actresses
Burmese female models
Burmese Theravada Buddhists
People from Yangon
Participants in Burmese reality television series
Republic Polytechnic alumni
21st-century Burmese actresses